St Bride Library (formerly known as St Bride Printing Library and St Bride Typographical Library) is a library in London primarily devoted to printing, book arts, typography and graphic design. The library is housed in the St Bride Foundation Institute in Bride Lane, London EC4, a small street leading south of Fleet Street near its intersection with New Bridge Street, in the City of London. It is centrally located in the area traditionally synonymous with the British Press and once home to many of London's newspaper publishing houses. The Library is named after the nearby church, St Bride's Church, the so-called "Cathedral of Fleet Street". The Bridewell Theatre is the theatre attached to the Foundation.

St Bride Library opened on 20 November 1895 as a technical library for the printing school and printing trades. The library remained, as the school relocated in 1922 to become what is now known as the London College of Communication. The library's collection has grown to incorporate a vast amount of printing-related material numbering about 65,000 books and pamphlets, in addition to back issues of some 3,600 serial publications and numerous artefacts. Among its extensive collection the library houses: an Eric Gill collection, a William Addison Dwiggins collection, a Beatrice Warde collection, types of the Oxford University Press, and punches of the Caslon and Figgins foundries. Much of the non-book material was acquired by long-serving librarian James Mosley between 1956 and 2000.

On the 30 July 2015 the long-term closure of the library was announced as a result of major funding issues. The library staff were made redundant and the future of the collections appeared in doubt. After a change of management in late 2015 the Trustees took the decision to allow limited access. No charge is made for access to the reading room but a fee of £1 per item is levied for titles retrieved from closed access storage. The limited Reading Room study space means that potential visitors must email the library in advance of their visit to ensure that they may be accommodated on open days.

The library is currently open each Wednesday from noon. Two research sessions are bookable each Wednesday, either between noon and 3pm or between 3.30pm and 6.30pm. The library closes between 3pm and 3.30pm for cleaning between study sessions. Those wishing to reserve a space should email library@sbf.org.uk for access.

See also

References

External links

St Bride Foundation website

Libraries in the City of London
Printing museums in England
Typography
1895 establishments in England
Grade II listed buildings in the City of London
Printing in England